The 2017–18 EFL Championship (referred to as the Sky Bet Championship for sponsorship reasons) was the second season of the EFL Championship under its current name, and the twenty-sixth season under its current league structure.

Team changes
The following teams had changed division since the 2016–17 season.

To Championship
Promoted from League One
 Sheffield United
 Bolton Wanderers
 Millwall

Relegated from Premier League
 Hull City
 Middlesbrough
 Sunderland

From Championship
Relegated to League One
 Blackburn Rovers
 Wigan Athletic
 Rotherham United

Promoted to Premier League
 Newcastle United
 Brighton & Hove Albion
 Huddersfield Town

Stadiums

Personnel and sponsoring

 1 According to current revision of List of current Premier League and English Football League managers.
 2 Current Norwich captain Russell Martin is on loan at Rangers, therefore Ivo Pinto will be the stand-in captain for the remainder of the season.
 3 Barnsley first team Captain was Angus MacDonald from August 2017 to January 2018. MacDonald left Barnsley in January 2018, after signing a new contract with Hull City. Adam Davies named as Barnsley's first team Vice-Captain in August 2017. In February 2018, Barnsley confirmed  Andy Yiadom as the first-team captain on the club's official website.

Managerial changes

League table

Play-offs

Results

Top scorers

Hat-tricks

4 Player scored 4 goals

Monthly awards

Attendances

References

 
EFL Championship seasons
1
2
Eng